Neodiachipteryx carinigera is a species of beetle in the family Carabidae, the only species in the genus Neodiachipteryx.

References

Harpalinae